Cottle is an unincorporated community in northeastern Nicholas County, West Virginia, United States. The town is located along West Virginia Route 20 at the foot of Cottle Knob in the area near Fire Tower Road.

References

Unincorporated communities in Nicholas County, West Virginia
Unincorporated communities in West Virginia